The 2017–18 Top 14 competition is the 119th French domestic rugby union club competition operated by the Ligue Nationale de Rugby (LNR). Two new teams from the 2016–17 Pro D2 season were promoted to Top 14 (Oyonnax and Agen) in place of the two relegated teams, Grenoble and Bayonne. It marks the second time in a row that both promoted teams had returned on their first opportunity after relegation (Oyonnax and Agen were both relegated during the 2015–16 Top 14 season).

Teams

Number of teams by regions

Competition format
The top six teams at the end of the regular season (after all the teams played one another twice, once at home, once away) enter a knockout stage to decide the Champions of France.  This consists of three rounds: the teams finishing third to sixth in the table play quarter-finals (hosted by the third and fourth placed teams). The winners then face the top two teams in the semi-finals, with the winners meeting in the final at the Stade de France in Saint-Denis.

The LNR uses a slightly different bonus points system from that used in most other rugby competitions. It trialled a new system in 2007–08 explicitly designed to prevent a losing team from earning more than one bonus point in a match, a system that also made it impossible for either team to earn a bonus point in a drawn match. LNR chose to continue with this system for subsequent seasons.

France's bonus point system operates as follows:

 4 points for a win.
 2 points for a draw.
 1 bonus point for winning while scoring at least 3 more tries than the opponent. This replaces the standard bonus point for scoring 4 tries regardless of the match result.
 1 bonus point for losing by 5 points (or fewer). The margin had been 7 points until being changed prior to the 2014–15 season.

Table

Relegation
Starting from the 2017–18 season forward, only the 14th placed team will be automatically relegated to Pro D2. The 13th placed team will face the runner-up of the Pro D2 play-off, with the winner of that play-off taking up the final place in Top 14 for the following season.

Fixtures & Results

Round 1

Round 2

Round 3

Round 4

Round 5

Round 6

Round 7

Round 8

Round 9

Round 10

Round 11

Round 12

Round 13

Round 14

Round 15

Round 16

Round 17

Round 18

Round 19

Round 20

Round 21

Round 22

Round 23

Round 24

Round 25

Round 26

Relegation playoff
The team finishing in 13th place faces the runner-up of the Pro D2, with the winner of this match playing in Top 14 in 2018–19 and the loser in Pro D2.

Playoffs

Semi-final Qualifiers

 Under LNR rules, when a playoff game ends level after extra time, the first tiebreaker is tries scored. Lyon advanced with 2 tries to Toulon's 1.

Semi-finals

Final

Leading scorers
Note: Flags to the left of player names indicate national team as has been defined under World Rugby eligibility rules, or primary nationality for players who have not yet earned international senior caps. Players may hold one or more non-WR nationalities.

Top points scorers

Top try scorers

Attendances

 Attendances do not include the semi-finals or final as these are at neutral venues.

See also
 2017–18 Rugby Pro D2 season

Notes

References

 
Top 14 seasons
   
France